Little Nightingale the Crier (Palestinian Arabic: Blebl is-sayyah) is a Palestinian Arab folktale collected by scholars Ibrahim Muhawi and Sharif Kanaana. It is related to the theme of the calumniated wife and classified in the international Aarne-Thompson-Uther Index as type ATU 707, "The Three Golden Children".

Origins 
According to researchers Yoel Shalom Perez and Judith Rosenhouse, the tale was collected by Muwahi and Kanaana in 'Arraba, in Galilee.

Summary 
Three sisters earn their living by spinning and selling their products. One day, however, the king decides to see if his subjects are loyal to him, and decrees that lighting a candle at night is forbidden. The three sisters despair at the fact, since they spin day and night, but decide to obey the prohibition. The elder sister then hopes for the king to pass by their house and to have him wed her to his baker so she can have bread; the middle one makes the same vow, and hopes to marry the king's cook to have food, and the third and youngest sister makes a vow to marry the king's son and promises to give birth to three children, 'Aladdin, Bahaddin and Šamsizzha, who, if she smiles, the sun will shine when it is raining, and if she cries, it will rain when it is sunny.

The king just happens to pass by the sisters' house and orders his vizier to mark their house with a symbol, so they can return later to bring the sisters. It happens so and the three women are brought to his presence, where they reiterate their wishes. The king fulfills their requests and marries the two elder sisters, respectively, to the baker and the cook, while the youngest sister marries the king's son. Driven by jealousy of their cadette's fortune, they bribe the midwife to replace the first child for a puppy, while they cast the baby in a box into the river. The box with the baby washes ashore on a distant orchard and is found by an old couple.

A similar fate befalls the princess's second and third child, who are replaced, respectively, by a kitten and a stone, cast in the sea in a box and saved by the same old couple. Deceived by his sisters-in-law, the king's son deserts his wife. Meanwhile, the three children are raised by the old couple, until their deaths. Now alone in the world, the three siblings move out to his father's city and buy a plot of land just across from the palace and build there a palace.

The siblings' aunts realize the three siblings are their nephews, and hire an old crone to pay them a visit. The old crone peddles her wares in front of their palace and Šamsizzha invites her in. The old crone compliments her beautiful palace, but it is missing the bird called Little Nightingale the Crier. The old crone goes away and Šamsizzha cries; her brothers notice that the weather has changed and race to see their sister. She explains that she wants the Little Nightingale the Crier, and her elder brother offers to get it, giving Bahaddin a ring as token of life and warning him to seek him if the ring tightens around his finger.

'Aladdin rides on untile he meets a ghoul, who directs him to his brother. The second ghoul directs him to his sister, a ghouleh (female ghoul) who is grinding salt, and advises him to taste the salt and to suckle her breasts. 'Aladdin follows the ghoul's instructions and manages to have the ghouleh take her in as a son. 'Aladdin tells her about his quest for Little Nightingale the Crier, and the ghouleh says her sons can help him.

The ghouleh's lame son offers to take him, and advises the human to approach the bird, which will begin to talk, but 'Aladdin must not reply. 'Aladdin is brought to the bird's orchard, which perches on a tree and begins to talk. The youth remains quiet and does not answer the bird a first time, but replies after the bird talks again. The animal blows on 'Aladdin and he becomes a stone.  

Bahaddin senses something wrong with his elder brothers and follows the same trail as him, passing by the three ghouls and reaching the bird's orchard. Once again, Bahaddin talks to the bird and it turns the boy into stone.

Finally, Šamsizzha sees that Bahaddin's ring has tightened around her finger, disguises herself in male clothes and goes to the road of the ghouls. With the ghouleh's advice, she arrives at the bird's orchard. The bird begins to talk to her, but Šamsizzha keeps quiet. After three times, the bird returns to its cage, and Šamsizzha captures it inside it. The bird begs to be released, but the girl orders the animal to revert the spell on her brothers. The bird tells her to pick up some dirt and to press it on the stones.

Šamsizzha obeys the bird and smears the dirt on the stones, restoring her brothers to life, as well as many others. Šamsizzha and her brothers return home and hang the bird's cage in their palace. Now back to their routine, the 'Aladdin and Bahaddin go back to frequenting the city's coffee houses. One day, they meet their father and invite him for dinner at their palace.

Little Nightingale the Crier advises the siblings to serve a dish of carrots with the fruits. The king eats with the siblings, who bid the bird to come eat with them. The bird declines, and mocks the king for believing that a woman can give birth to a puppy, a kitten and a stone. The king is taken aback by the bird's reply, and asks it to speak again. The bird repeats the same words, and reveals that 'Aladdin, Bahaddin and Šamsizzha are his children.

The king brings in the midwife, who is forced to reveal the whole truth, and he punishes her and the envious sister by burning them in a pyre and scattering their ashes.

Analysis

Tale type 
The tale is classified in the international Aarne-Thompson-Uther Index as type ATU 707, "The Three Golden Children". In this cycle of stories, a woman promises to bear children of wondrous aspect, who are taken from her as soon as they are born by her jealous relatives (her sisters or her mother-in-law). The children survive and are adopted by a childless couple. Years later, the children are sent on a quest for marvellous items, which will eventually lead to reuniting the family.

Variants 
The tale type appears in fairy tale collections of Middle Eastern and Arab folklore. Scholar Hasan El-Shamy lists 72 variants of the tale type across Middle Eastern and North African sources. He also stated that variants were collected "in the Eastern part of the Arab culture area", namely, in Palestine, Syria, Lebanon and Iraq.

Palestine 
In a Palestinian version from Birzeit, collected by Orientalist Paul E. Kahle with the title Die ausgesetzten Zwillingskinder ("The abandoned twin children"), the third and youngest sister promises to give birth to twins, a boy and a girl with silver and golden hair, but the girl shall have three teeth: one to quench the thirsty, the second to satiate the hungry and the third to feed the tired. The twins are still set on a quest for a bird that flaps its wings and sings.

Israel 
According to an early analysis by Israeli folklorist , the Israel Folktale Archive (IFA) contained at first two variants of the tale type, one from a Yemeni source, and another from a Turkish source. A later study by scholar  listed 7 variants in the Jewish Oriental tale corpus.

Author Penninah Schram published an Israeli tale titled Children of the King: three sisters live together who are skilled weavers, but the youngest has the best craftsmanship. One night, they rest and talk about their king who is ready to choose a wife, and boast about their skills: the eldest claims she can weave a tapestry to cover the walls of the palace, the middle one that she can sew a tent to cover the entire army, and the youngest that she will bear three children, two boys and a girl, unlike the world has ever seen. The king, who was passing by, overhears their conversation and sends for them the next morning. After inquiring the three sisters, the two elders dismiss their boasts, while the youngest declares she can fulfill hers, since she saw it in a dream. The king marries the third sister, to the jealousy of the elder two, who conspire with the midwife to take the babies, replace them for cats and abandon them in the woods. It happens so: the queen is expelled by the king, while the children are found by a poor old woman. Years later, the aunts pass by the old woman's house and, realizing their nephews and nieace are alive, she convinces the sister to send her brothers on a quest for a pool and a nightingale that sings songs. The elder brother fails and is trapped along other prisoners, but his younger brother takes the bird and saves his elder. Later, the king passes by the siblings' house and notices the sister's beauty, when the nightingale begins to sing about it. The king wonders about its behaviour, and it sings again about the three children. The old woman who raised them appears with the cloths they were wrapped in when she found them, which the monarch recognizes as his wife's handiwork. Realizing the ruse, he punishes his sisters-in-law, reinstates the queen and rewards the old woman. In her notes, Schram classified the tale as type 879*G, despite recognizing its connection to type 707, and stated the existence of at least 22 variants in the IFA archive.

Middle East 
According to scholars  and Richard van Leewen, apart from the tale The Sisters Envious of Their Cadette, the compilation The Arabian Nights contains a second variant titled Abú Niyyan and Abú Niyyatayn, part of the frame story The Tale of the Sultan of Yemen and his three sons (The Tale of the King of al-Yaman and his three sons). The tale is divided into two parts: the tale of the father's generation falls under tale type ATU 613, "Truth and Falsehood"; the sons' generation follows type ATU 707. In the second part, Abu Niyyan marries a princess and is declared king. His sisters-in-law take their male nephews as soon as they are born and cast them in the water, but they are saved by the gardener. Abu Niyyan's wife gives birth to her third child, a daughter, whom they raise together. When the girl attains marriageable age, she begins to take a keen interest in the gardener's adopted sons, which leads to the truth being exposed. A third version present in The Arabian Nights is The Tale of the Sultan and his sons and the Enchanting Bird, a fragmentary version that focuses on the quest for the bird with petrifying powers.

In an Arab variant, "Царевич и три девушки" ("The Emperor and the Three Girls"), three poor weaving sisters work late at night by candlelight, when the prince comes and spies on them. He overhears the oldest boasting that she would weave a carpet for the entire army to sit, the middle one that she would cook enough food to feed his army, and the youngest that she would bear "a bar of gold and a bar of silver". The prince summons them to his presence, and the youngest explains she meant a son (gold) and a daughter (silver). Her sisters replace them for puppies, and she is banished from the palace. The twins are found by a fisherman. In this version, the prince simply meets the twins while walking through the city, and remarries his own wife, without knowing it at first.

In another Middle Eastern tale, The Shrieking Nightingale, four poor sisters, Watfa, Alya, Nasma and Najma, work by spinning wool and selling it. One day, they buy some bread and stop to rest and eat in an abandoned hut. They see the king's son on a hut - who is actually overhearing the sisters - and declare their wishes: the elder two wish to work in the kitchen peeling garlic and onions, so they can eat better food there; the third sister wants to knead the dough, but the youngest states she'd have be poor with pride then accept marrying the king's son. The king's son, Maher, just happens to enter the room to inquire the youngest sister about her decision; she answers that she might feel humiliated by being the wife of the prince. He does choose Najma as his wife, and takes the other sisters to work and live in the palace. However, the elder sisters begin to hate their cadette's fortune, and conspire to harm her: they bribe the midwife to replace Najma's children, a boy and a girl, for a dog and a stone. The elder two sisters lock the twins in a box, but Nasma, the third sister, places a bag of money in their box out of pity. They cast the box in the sea, but the box is rescued by a poor fisherman called Meri, who releases the twins from the box and raises them with his wife Saada. They move out to another village and name the boy Clever Hasan and the girl Sitt al-Ihsan, who become skilled youngs. Meanwhile, their mother, queen Najma, is trapped in a tower, away from her husband, while the king sets an equestrian competition. Clever Hasan excels at the games and draws the attention of the king Maher. The aunts realize that Clever Hasan is their nephew, and Watfa and Alya hatch a plan to kill him: they send the midwife to the king's mother palace and says that it lacks the shrieking nightingale with feathers of many colours and able to sing in seven languages which lies in the city of the jinn and only Clever Hasan can bring it to him. With the guidance of three she-ghouls, Clever Hasan brings the bird to him, but the nightgingale does not sing and appears to be despondent. Until one day, when the evil midwife pays a visit to the king, the nightingale shrieks about the disgraced queen and her children. On hearing this, king Maher unravels the truth and releases his wife from prison, leaving the fate of her persecutors to her. Queen Najma forgives her sister Nasma, banishes the elder two to their old village, and orders the execution of the midwife. The king also rewards the fisherman and his wife and takes them to live in the palace with Clever Hasan and Sitt al-Ihsan.

In a Middle Eastern tale titled The Forsaken Queen, three sisters live in a kingdom by the sea and earn their living by selling the woolen articles they sew and weave at night. However, the local king forbids lighting lamps at night to protect the kingdom from pirates' night raids. One night, the king and his prime minister diguise themselves and mingle with the people, finding the only illuminated house in the city: the three sisters'. They spy on their conversation: the elder sisters wish to marry the king's baker and cook, respectively, to have access to good food, while the youngest says she "dreams" of marrying the king and promises to bear him twins, a boy with half of his hair of gold and the other of silver, and a girl whose laugh can make the sun shine and whose sadness makes the rain come. The next morning, the king sends for the three sisters and scolds them for disobeying the royal decree, but fulfills their marriage wishes, the youngest sister, named Razan, marrying the king. However, the monarch gives her an ultimatum: either she gives birth to her promised twins, and live in luxury and comfort, or, failing that, she will be banished to a secluded house. Fortunately, Razan does give birth to her twins, to the chagrin of the king's two co-wives, who take the children and cast them in the river in a basket, and place little animals in the cradle. The twins are saved by the gardener, and given the names Firas (the boy) and Manal (the girl). They later decide to see the world, and sail on a raft that is found by a seaman (who is in reality a disguised king of fairies), who takes the twins as their own and raises them. Years later, the king of fairies gives the twins a magic ring that can summon a genie to help them, and the twins move out to their father's city, where they create a palace right in front of the king's with the ring's genie. The king's co-wives learn of the twins' survival and send an old midwife to get rid of them. She pays Manal a visit and talks to her about three wonderful objects that can enhance the grandiosity of their home: the joyous birds, the lighting gown, and the lady of the Fancy Garden, Lady Maliha herself. With the help and advice of an old man, Firas brings the birds: he takes a branch from the joyous tree, and plants it in his garden; the next day, a tree sprouts with a male and a female bird perched on it. He next quests for the lighting gown, which is given by the lady of the Fancy Garden, and is able to shine brilliantly at night. At the end of the tale, Lady Maliha joins the twins and invites the king for a feast at their palace, where she reveals the whole truth.

Lebanon 
The prince marries all three, and the elder sisters replace the children for a cat and a dog. They are saved by a fisherman and his wife, who sell the children's metal-coated hair in the market. They become rich, their parents die and they move out to a palace in the prince's city. Their aunts send them on a quest for a tree with drums and music and a bride for his brother. The bride, with her omniscient knowledge, narrates the twins' story to the king during a dinner.

In a Lebanese tale translated by author Inea Bushnaq as The Nightingale that Speaks, to test his subjects' loyalty, a king orders that no one shall keep any light at night. One night, he goes with his vizier to visit a poor house where three sisters live and spin wool. He overhears their conversation: the eldest sister wishes to marry the king's baker, the middle one the king's cook, and the youngest wants to marry any man, even the king's son, who can take carry clothes for her to the Turkish bath, and would bear twins, a boy with a lock of silver and a girl with a lock of gold. The king takes them to the palace and marries them to their husbands of choice. Despite living in the palace, the elder sisters begin to nurture envy towards their cadette, and plot against her when the king's son departs for war. When their sister gives birth to her twins, the elder sister replace them for a kitten and a puppy, place the twins in a wicker basket and cast them in the water. The wicker basket is found by a gardener. The man and his wife raise the twins until they die, and the twins live in the gardener's house. One day, one of their aunts recognizes them and sends the old midwife to their house. The midwife tells the twin sister about the Bulbul as-Siah, the Nightingale that Speaks. The twin sister asks her brother to bring it to her. The twin brother, with the help of a ghoul, takes part in a chain of quests: to get the nightingale, he has to find the Rice-Bearing Tree; to get the tree, he has to find the daughter of the king of the Far City. The twin brother takes the objects and the princess with him back to his sister, and he marries the princess. One day, the king, their father, visits their house to see the wondrous items (the bird and the tree), and the bird sings a song about how ridiculous it is that a human woman gave birth to animals.

Syria 
In a Syrian variant from Tur Abdin, collected by Eugen Prym and Albert Socin, Ssa'îd, the king of grasshoppers, has three wives, but no children yet. The third wife, also the youngest, gives birth to a boy and a girl, who are replaced for cats and thrown in the water. They are rescued by a fisherman and his wife, and whenever they are bathed, gold and silver appear in the bathwater. One day, when the brother is insulted for not knowing his true parentage, he leaves his adoptive parents with his sister. They then move to a hut near the king's residence, which they demolish and build a palace. The brother is the one to reveal the whole truth to his father, the king.

In a Syrian tale collected by Uwe Kuhr with the title Die drei Schwestern ("The Three Sisters"), one night, three sisters confess their innermost desires: the eldest wants to marry the king's cook to eat the best dishes; the middle one the king's pastrymaker to eat the finest sweets; and the youngest the king himself, for she wants to bear him a brave and clever son. The king overhears their talk and summons them the next morning to his palace. The king marries the youngest, to the sisters' jealousy. When their sister gives birth to twins, a boy and a girl, they cast the children in a box in the river and tell the king the babies were stillborn. The box is saved by a childless sheik, who adopts the twins and names them Jamil (the boy) and Jamila (the girl). Years later, when the sheik dies, their jealous aunts send them for the silver water, the golden tree and the truth-telling peacock, located in the Mountain of Wonders.

Iraq 
Novelist and ethnologist E. S. Drower collected an Iraqi tale titled The King and the Three Maidens, or the Doll of Patience. This tale focuses on the mother's plight: the youngest sister promises children born with hair of gold on one side and silver on the other, but, as soon as they are born, the children are cast into the water by the envious older sisters. She is told she must never reveal the truth to her husband, the king, so she buys a doll to confide in (akin to The Young Slave and ATU 894, "").

In a dialectal variant collected in Baghdad with the title The Nightingale, a sultan's son camps out with his army near the grand vizier's three daughters. Each of the girls announce their wishes to marry the sultan's son by performing grand feats: the oldest by baking a loaf of bread to feed the sultan's son and the army, the middle by weaving a carpet large enough for everyone to seat, and the youngest by bearing twins, a boy with gold locks and a girl with silver locks. The sultan's son marries the elder girl first, but when she states she cannot bake a loaf of bread as she described, she is downgraded to the kitchen. The same happens to the second sister. When the third sister does bear her twins, her sisters replace the children for puppies and throw them in the river. The twins are saved by a fisherman and his wife; whenever they bathe the twins, a bar of gold and a bar of silver appear. Their aunts send them after the clapping apples, the ululating pomegranates, and the singing nightingale.

Assyrian people 
In a tale from the Assyrian people published by Russo-Assyrian author  with the title "Царь Шах-Аббас и три девушки" ("Tsar Shah-Abbas and the Three Girls"), Emperor Shah Abbas spies on three sisters talking, the youngest promising to bear male twins with curls of pearl. After their birth, the sisters replace them for puppies and puts them in the water in a box. Both boys are saved by a miller. When they are nine years old, they wreck their adoptive father's mill and decide to leave home. They settle in a house in the wood that belong to their biological father, Shah-Abbas. One of his messengers scolds the boys and orders them to appear at the king's presence. They pass by a woman and do not spit on her. The twins wonder why she is in a sorry state, and a jet of milk from her breasts enters their mouths. The guards send them to the king, who asks about their life story, and summons his disgraced wife, who confirms the twins' narration.

Saudi Arabia 
As part of fieldwork in Jizan region, researcher Waleed Ahmed Himli collected in 2008 a tale from 88-year-old teller Nema Amshanaq. In her tale, titled El-Bolbol El-Saiyyah ("The Singing Nightingale" or "The Warbler Nightingale"), a king is going to the hajj, and tells his mother to look after his pregnant wife. The wife gives birth to "beautiful" twins, a boy and a girl, who are taken from her by the queen mother and cast in the water in a box. The twins are saved by a fisherman and his wife, who give the boy a magical ring. Years later, the queen mother visits the twins and convinces the girl to ask her brother for a flowing river beside their palace, fragrant roses and a singing nightingale - which the brother obtains by using the magic ring to wish for them. Lastly, the boy searches for the "China China Girl" as his bride, and goes on a journey to find her. Himli also indicates that the tale type is "widely reported ... [from] various parts of Saudi Arabia".

Kurdish people 
In a Kurdish tale published by Kurdologist Margarita Rudenko with the title "Мирза-Мамуд и Хезаран-Больболь" ("Mirza-Mamud and Khezaran-Bolbol"), the padishah marries three sisters, the yougest promising to give birth to golden-haired twins, a boy and a girl. Her envious sisters replace the children for animals and cast them in the sea in a box. The box is rescued by a miller, who saves the twins and names them Mirza-Mamud (the boy) and Golizar (the girl). Years later, they move to a new house and the boy meets his father, the Padishah, in a deer hunt. The queen's sisters despair and send an old woman to convince Golizar and Mirza-Mamud to go on a dangerous quest for a maiden named Зардухубар (Zardukhubar). Mirza-Mamud rescues Zardukhubar and they escape from an ogress (tale type ATU 313H*, connected to The Magical Flight or The Devil's Daughter). Zardukhubar becomes Golizar's house companion. Later, the old woman tells the siblings about a magical bird named Khezaran-Bolbol. Mirza-Mamud fails the quest and is petrified. Noticing his long absence, Golizar and Zardukhubar seek him out. They meet an old hermit on the way who tells them how to safely capture the bird. Both women rescue the youth and a whole garden of petrified people. On their way back, the hermit asks them for a prayer, which the trio do and disenchant him into a handsome young man. The quartet is invited to a feast with the king, but the bird warns them their food is poisoned. As instructed by the bird, the siblings invite their father, the padishah, to their house, where the whole truth is revealed.

Kurdologists Ordîxanê Jalîl, Celîlê Celîl and Zine Jalil collected another Kurdish tale in 1976 from informant Osei Shababa. In this tale, titled "Златокудрые" ("Golden-Curls"), a padishah forbids lighting up a source of light in any house at night, but one house's residents break the prohibition. The padishah and his vizir visit the house and overhear the conversation of three spinning sisters: the eldest promises to make a grand meal for the padishah if he takes her for wife; the middle one promises to weave a unique and singular carpet and the youngest promises to bear him a boy and a girl with golden curls. The padishah marries the youngest and goes to war; a witch takes the children, replaces them for puppies and casts them in a box in the sea. The box with the children washes ashore; a deer sees the twins and nurses them. Years later, the boy, named Hussein, and the girl, named Gulizar, build a house for them and make garments made of gazelle skin. One day, the padisah hunts some gazelles and is led to the twins' house. He admires the boy's golden curls and imagines what his son could have been. Realizing the twins are their nephews, the padishah's sisters-in-law send the witch to the twins' house. The witch passes herself as a devotee on a hajj and convinces them to seek, first, after a magical tablecloth that produces food with a magical wand, and, later, for a maiden named Шарихубар (Sharikhubar). When Hussein goes for her, her powers petrify him, so his sister Gulizar is the one to rescue him and get Sharikhubar back home. At last, Sharikhubar helps them reveal the truth of their origin.

Researcher Sara Belelli collected and published a Kurdish variant in the Laki language from Kermanshah, with the title Mā(h) pīšānī ("Moon-forehead") (tale types ATU 480 and ATU 707): a girl meets by the riverbank an old ugly woman and compliments her head. When the river water becomes yellow, the old woman throws the girl in the river and she comes out with a moon and a star on her forehead. When the girl's stepsister meets the old woman, she insult her and becomes ugly. The tale then focuses on a prince, who meets Māh pīšānī and her two elder sisters: the elder promises to cook a man of rice to feed 500 people; the middle one that she can weave a carpet large enough for a thousand people, and Māh pīšānī promises to bear him a boy who can cry tears of pearl and a girl whose laughter produces flowers.

See also 
 The Story of Arab-Zandiq

References 

Female characters in fairy tales
Fictional kings
Fictional queens
Twins in fiction
Fictional twins
Child abandonment
Adoption forms and related practices
Adoption, fostering, orphan care and displacement
Birds in culture
Fictional birds
ATU 700-749